The New Light Missionary Baptist Church was a historic church at 522 Arkansas Street in Helena, Arkansas.  It was a two-story wood-frame brick and masonry structure, built in 1917 for an African-American congregation organized in 1894.  Its Gothic Revival design bore some resemblance to Helena's Centennial Baptist Church (a National Historic Landmark), but this building's architect is not known.  Its main facade had a single tall gable, with a three-story tower at the southwest corner.  A pair of entrances on the first level were topped by three lancet-style windows in the gable, the center one larger than those flanking it.  The interior was simply decorated.

The building was listed on the National Register of Historic Places in 1995.  It was subsequently demolished, and was delisted in 2018.

See also
National Register of Historic Places listings in Phillips County, Arkansas

References

Baptist churches in Arkansas
Churches on the National Register of Historic Places in Arkansas
Gothic Revival church buildings in Arkansas
Churches completed in 1917
Churches in Phillips County, Arkansas
National Register of Historic Places in Phillips County, Arkansas
Former National Register of Historic Places in Arkansas
Demolished buildings and structures in Arkansas